Armand Shkullaku is an Albanian journalist, editor in chief of ABC News Albania and president of Association of Professional Journalists of Albania.

References

Living people
Albanian journalists
Year of birth missing (living people)
Place of birth missing (living people)